A general election for the Australian Capital Territory Legislative Assembly was held on Saturday, 15 October 2016.

The 15-year incumbent Labor Party, led by Chief Minister Andrew Barr, won a fifth term over the main opposition Liberal Party, led by opposition leader Jeremy Hanson. On election night, ABC analyst Antony Green predicted that Labor would once again form a minority government with the support of the Greens, with Liberal leader Hanson saying in a speech it would be very difficult for the Liberals to win government. On 22 October, the final list of elected candidates was confirmed; the Labor Party winning 12 seats, the Liberal Party 11 seats and the Greens 2 seats. Labor and the Greens subsequently signed off on a formal Parliamentary Agreement, which outlined shared policy priorities and allowed Greens leader Shane Rattenbury to retain a seat in the Cabinet whilst mandating that the Greens not move or support any motion of no confidence in the Labor Government, except in instances of gross misconduct or corruption.

Prior to this election, candidates were elected to fill all 17 Legislative Assembly seats in the unicameral parliament which consisted of three multi-member electorates, Brindabella (five seats), Ginninderra (five seats) and Molonglo (seven seats), using a proportional representation single transferable vote method known as the Hare-Clark system. On 5 August 2014, the Assembly voted to increase the size of the Assembly to 25 members, elected from five electorates of five seats each. The Hare-Clark system continued. The election was conducted by the ACT Electoral Commission.

Of the 25 elected members, 13 were women, representing the first female parliamentary majority in Australian history.

Results 

|}

Primary vote by electorate

Final distribution of seats

Key dates 
Last day to lodge applications for party register: 30 June 2016
Party registration closed: 8 September 2016
Pre-election period commenced and nominations opened: 9 September 2016
Rolls close: 16 September 2016
Nominations close: 21 September 2016
Nominations declared and ballot paper order determined: 22 September 2016
Pre-poll voting commences: 27 September 2016
Polling day: 15 October 2016
Last day for receipt of postal votes: 21 October 2016

Background 

The incumbent Labor Party led by Chief Minister Andrew Barr attempted to win re-election for a fifth term in the unicameral ACT Legislative Assembly. Labor, led by Katy Gallagher, formed a minority coalition government with the Greens after the 2012 election, where Labor won 8 seats, Liberal 8 seats, Greens 1 seat. The Greens retained their balance of power in the election despite losing the majority of their 4-seat representation, with sole remaining representative Shane Rattenbury entering the cabinet to form a coalition government. Gallagher resigned as Chief Minister and Labor leader on 5 December 2014 to enter the Senate in the vacancy left by Kate Lundy. She was replaced by her deputy Andrew Barr on 11 December 2014.

The opposition, the Liberal Party, also had a change in leadership. Zed Seselja, the leader of the party since 2007, stood down on 11 February 2013, to challenge Liberal Party pre-selection for the Senate at the 2013 federal election. Seselja eventually won his pre-selection bid, and was elected Senator for the Australian Capital Territory at the federal election. He was replaced as leader of the Liberal Party by Jeremy Hanson.

All members of the unicameral Assembly faced re-election, with members being elected by the Hare-Clark system of proportional representation. The Assembly was previously divided into three electorates: five-member Brindabella (including Tuggeranong and parts of the Woden Valley) and Ginninderra (including Belconnen and suburbs) and seven-member Molonglo (including North Canberra, South Canberra, Gungahlin, Weston Creek, and the remainder of the Woden Valley). These electorates, were redistributed following the increase in the size of the Assembly to 25 seats.

At the end of May 2015, the following electorates were announced:
Brindabella – contains the district of Tuggeranong (except the suburb of Kambah).
Ginninderra – contains the district of Belconnen (except the suburbs of Evatt, Giralang, Kaleen, McKellar and Lawson).
Kurrajong – contains the districts of Canberra Central and Majura
Murrumbidgee – contains the districts of the Woden Valley, Weston Creek, Molonglo Valley and the Tuggeranong suburb of Kambah.
Yerrabi – contains the districts of Gungahlin, Hall and the Belconnen suburbs of Evatt, Giralang, Kaleen, McKellar and Lawson.

Election dates are set in statute with four-year fixed terms, to be held on the third Saturday of October every four years.

Campaign 
The opposition Liberal Party opposed the Light rail in Canberra project, so did the Like Canberra and Sustainable Australia. In April 2015, the Liberal party announced it would cancel any contracts for the light rail if it won the 2016 ACT election. A year out from the poll, the light rail project was already predicted to be the election's major issue. As predicted, the light rail project was the major issue of the campaign. The election saw the Labor government returned, with the party claiming the result as an endorsement of the project.

Candidates

Registered parties 
Twelve parties were registered with the ACT Electoral Commission as eligible for the October 2016 election, ten of which nominated candidates for the election.
 Animal Justice Party
 Australian Labor Party (ACT Branch)
 Australian Sex Party ACT
 Canberra Community Voters
 Liberal Democratic Party
 Liberal Party
 Like Canberra
 Sustainable Australia (ACT)
 The ACT Greens
 The Community Alliance Party (ACT)
 The Flux Party – ACT (did not contest)
 VoteCanberra (did not contest)

Retiring members

Labor 
 Simon Corbell (Molonglo)

Liberal 
 Val Jeffery (Brindabella)

Brindabella 
Five seats were up for election.

Ginninderra 
Five seats were up for election.

Kurrajong 
Five seats were up for election.

Murrumbidgee 
Five seats were up for election.

Yerrabi 
Five seats were up for election.

Newspaper endorsements

See also 
 2012 Australian Capital Territory general election
 Members of the Australian Capital Territory Legislative Assembly, 2012–2016

References

External links 
Elections ACT: 2016 Legislative Assembly election
Australian Broadcasting Corporation: ACT Election 2016

2016 elections in Australia
Elections in the Australian Capital Territory
October 2016 events in Australia
2010s in the Australian Capital Territory